Robert Carroll Johnson is a former American football coach and college athletics administrator.  He served as the athletic director at Eastern Illinois University (1980–1988), Miami University (1989–1994), Temple University (1994–1995), and the University of Memphis (1996–2012).

In November 2009, Johnson contract with Memphis was extended to run through June 2013.  In November 2011, Johnson announced his plans to leave the athletic director's position on June 30, 2012.  He will be paid beyond that date as per his contract extension.

References

Year of birth missing (living people)
Living people
Eastern Illinois Panthers athletic directors
Iowa Hawkeyes football coaches
Memphis Tigers athletic directors
Miami RedHawks athletic directors
Minnesota State Mavericks football coaches
Northern Iowa Panthers football coaches
Temple Owls athletic directors
Youngstown State Penguins football coaches
People from Ottawa, Illinois
Educators from Illinois